Operation Latchkey was a series of 38 nuclear tests conducted by the United States in 1966–1967 at the Nevada Test Site. These tests followed the Operation Flintlock (nuclear test) series and preceded the Operation Crosstie series.

Nuclear tests

Persimmon
Persimmon included a vertical line-of-sight pipe fitted with a fast-acting closure. At the time of detonation, this vacuum pipe provided a pathway for neutrons from the nuclear device to travel to instruments in a tower located above the shot hole. A few seconds after detonation, these instruments and their samples were dragged out of the tower on a sled, before the subsidence crater formed and destroyed the tower.

List of the nuclear tests

References

Explosions in 1966
Explosions in 1967
1966 in military history
1967 in military history
Latchkey
1966 in the United States
1967 in the United States